No Way is the second album by Run On, released in 1997 through Matador Records.

Critical reception
Tucson Weekly called the album "phenomenal," writing that "Run On delivers avant-garde pop of a ... dark sensibility with a sophisticated, technically educated and carefully orchestrated approach." The Austin Chronicle praised the "lo-fi production, mudfuzz guitar with tom-tom driven Delta rhythms, graveyard violin, and Sue Garner's dusty-road clarion call (hubby Rick Brown and guitarist Alan Licht also sing), all wrapped around hooky pop songs." 

Guitar Player wrote that Alan Licht surrounds Garner's vocals "with ominous clouds of droning feedback, supporting the song's melodic flow for two or three verses before unleashing a short, furious storm of groans, squeals and rapid-fire hammer-ons." The Pittsburgh Post-Gazette wrote that the "nine originals [span] the indie-pop spectrum from the impossibly quirky 'As Good As New' to the heartbreaking violin-fueled lament, 'Anything You Say'."

Track listing

Personnel 
Run On
Rick Brown – drums, synthesizer, marimba, vocals, programming
Sue Garner – bass guitar, guitar, piano, vocals, design
Katie Gentile – violin, organ, cowbell, backing vocals
Alan Licht – guitar, chord organ, cowbell, vocals
Production and additional personnel
Hugh Hamrick – painting
Rod Hui – mixing on "Something Sweet", "Road" and "Sinner Man"
Brent Lambert – mastering
Casey Rice – engineering, mixing

References

External links 
 

1997 albums
Matador Records albums
Run On (band) albums